"Cheese-eating surrender monkeys", sometimes shortened to "surrender monkeys", is a pejorative term for French people. The term is based on the stereotype of the French that they surrender quickly. It was coined in 1995 by Ken Keeler, a writer for the television series The Simpsons, and has entered two Oxford quotation dictionaries.

The French and the British have a history of mocking one another. Despite some being offended, generally both sides take it in the spirit it was meant to be taken, a light-hearted joke.

Origin
The term "cheese-eating surrender monkeys" first appeared in 'Round Springfield", an episode from April 1995 of the American animated television show The Simpsons. In the episode, budget cuts at Springfield Elementary School force the school's Scottish janitor, Groundskeeper Willie, to teach French. Expressing his disdain for the French people, he says to his French class: "Bonjourrrrrrrrr, you cheese-eating surrender monkeys!" with his heavy Scottish accent.

On the episode's audio commentary, executive producer Al Jean said the line was "probably" written by The Simpsons staff writer Ken Keeler. In a February 2012 interview, Keeler confirmed that he coined the term; he said he considers it his best contribution to the show. Al Jean commented that the staff did not expect the term to become widely used and never intended it as any kind of genuine political statement.

When Round Springfield" was dubbed in French, in France, the line became "Rendez vous, singes mangeurs de fromage" ("Surrender, you cheese-eating monkeys"). In Canada, meanwhile, the French dubbed version skips over the line and says "Bonjour, aujourd'hui on va étudier l'accord du participe futur" ("Hi, today we'll be studying the agreement of the future participle").

Politics
Opposition Leader Bill Shorten used it in Australian Parliament on 6 March 2014, describing the Government of Australia as "the cheese-eating surrender monkeys of Australian jobs". When asked to withdraw the comment, Shorten claimed he borrowed the line from an American politician, whom he could not name. On 28 July 2014, Australia's Immigration Minister Scott Morrison used it to describe the Labor and Greens position on asylum seekers.

Journalism
Jonah Goldberg, an American National Review journalist, used it in the title of an April 1999 column on the "Top Ten Reasons to Hate the French". In the run up to and during the Iraq War, Goldberg reprised it to criticize European nations and France in particular for not joining the Coalition of the Willing, the United States-led invasion and occupation of Iraq.

Ben Macintyre of The Times wrote in August 2007 that it is "perhaps the most famous" of the coinages from The Simpsons and it "has gone on to become a journalistic cliché". The New York Post used it (as "Surrender Monkeys") as the headline for its December 7, 2006, front page, referring to the Iraq Study Group, and its recommendation that American soldiers be withdrawn from Iraq by January 2008.

The Daily Telegraph (November 2010) cited it in relation to Anglo-French military cooperation. In August 2013, The Independent suggested an evolution away from the term, in a headline about French-American relations over the Syrian Civil War.

Other uses
Anthony Bourdain described fellow chef Patrick Clark in his book Kitchen Confidential (2000) as follows: "He was kind of famous; he was big and black; most important, he was an American, one of us, not some cheese-eating, surrender specialist Froggie."

Jeremy Clarkson used it on Top Gear in June 2003, describing the handling of the Renault Clio V6. He later used it in a 4 June 2006 episode of Top Gear, to describe the manufacturers of the Citroën C6. Later on in the television show, (Series 13, Episode 5) Clarkson describes the other French drivers as "cheese-eating sideways monkeys", referring to the fact that the other drivers were overtaking him while sliding sideways.

In 2005, Nigel Farage utilised the phrase in a debate with Tony Blair over the United Kingdom's financial contributions to the European Union, in which Farage compared Blair unfavourably to Jacques Chirac, whom Farage praised for standing up for the French people, while accusing Blair of failing to do the same for the British people.

Ned Sherrin selected it for inclusion in the Oxford Dictionary of Humorous Quotations, being introduced in the third edition in 2005. It is also included in the Oxford Dictionary of Modern Quotations.

See also
Anti-French sentiment in the United States
Freedom fries
Axis of weasels
Francophobia
 112 Gripes about the French

References

Bibliography

External links
Round Springfield" episode guide – The Simpsons Archive
References to France on The Simpsons – The Simpsons Archive

Cheese
1995 neologisms
American phraseology
Francophobia in North America
The Simpsons
1990s neologisms
Pejorative terms for European people
Metaphors referring to food and drink
France–United States relations
Metaphors referring to monkeys